Pu is a Chinese word meaning "unworked wood; inherent quality; simple" that was an early Daoist metaphor for the natural state of humanity, and relates with the Daoist keyword ziran (literally "self so") "natural; spontaneous". The scholar Ge Hong (283-343 CE) immortalized pu in his pen name Baopuzi "Master who Embraces Simplicity" and eponymous book Baopuzi.

Terminology

Characters

The Chinese character pu  was first recorded on Chinese bronze inscriptions from the Spring and Autumn period (771-476 BCE), and the character pu  was first recorded in Chinese classics from the Warring States period (475-221 BCE).

When the People's Republic of China promulgated simplified Chinese characters in 1956, the established variant pu  (with 6 strokes) was chosen to replace the traditional Chinese character pu  (with 16 strokes).

One of the two (c. 168 BCE) Mawangdui silk manuscript versions of the Daodejing, discovered in 1973 by archeologists excavating a tomb, uses a rare textual variant character for pu : wò  "a house tent (esp. with a wooden roof)", written with the "tree radical" and wu  "room; house" phonetic. The "B" text, like the received version, uses pu  8 times in 6 chapters; the "A" text uses wò  6 times in 4 chapters and has lacunae in chapters 19 and 57. The (c. 121 CE) Shuowen jiezi defines wo  as muzhang  "wood canopy", and the (early 3rd century) Guangya defines it as choumu  "curtain; cover". These variant words pú < *phrôk  "unworked wood" and wò < *ʔôk  "house tent" are semantically and phonologically dissimilar.

Pronunciations and meanings

The glyph  can be read:
pǔ 
"unworked wood", 
"cut down; fell trees" 
"nature; essence; intrinsic quality" (compare English in the rough)
"simple; plain; unadorned; unaffected"
"(economics) net cost"
pú 
"grow thickly (of plants); shrub"
"an oak tree"
"attached; affixed"

The glyph  can be read to mean:
pǔ 
"unworked wood; natural; plain; etc." (= pǔ )
"large"
"uncured meat" 
pū
 "root; basis; origin"
"beat; hit; an instrument of torture" (= pū )
pò 
"tree bark; (esp.) magnolia bark" in houpo  "Magnolia officinalis bark (used in Traditional Chinese medicine)" 
in pòshù  "Celtis sinensis, Chinese hackberry"
pō 
in pōdāo  "a kind of two-handed sword"
Pú 
"a surname", namely Park (Korean surname)
Piáo
 "a surname"

The Erya, which is the oldest Chinese dictionary, defined pu  and supu  as "oak" names (in "Explaining Trees" chapter 14). First, pu  is defined as bao  (14:45). Guo Pu's Erya commentary identified this pu tree as yupu  "Quercus acutissima, saw-tooth oak" (which occurs in the Shijing below). Bao  is usually read fu "drumstick", and Guo noted this name bao denoted "a kind of oak [] that grew in clumps", and quotes the Shijing usage as baoli  instead of baoli  "bushy oak" (see below). The Bencao Gangmu says there are two varieties of hu  "Quercus mongolica, Mongolian oak", the bao  is small and grows in clumps while the li  is tall and has large leaves. Second, supu  is defined as xin  "heart; mind" (14:64). Guo identifies supu (cf. reverse pusu  in the Shijing below) as husu  (with hu  "Mongolian oak"), the "Quercus dentata, daimyo oak". While xin "heart; mind" is a common Chinese word, this Erya definition is the only known context in which it names a tree. The Yijing uses xin to mean "thorn; prick",: "Among varieties of wood it means those which are firm and have much pith".

The Shuowen Jiezi, the first Chinese dictionary of characters, simply defines pu  as mupi  "tree bark; wood with bark", and pu  as musu  "plain wood; unworked lumber" (later meaning "lignin" in scientific terminology).

Returning to the central Daoist meaning of pu, 
Pas and Leung challenge the stereotyped  "uncarved block" translation of pu: "The idea implied in it comes closer to "wholeness," which is also contained in "uncarved block," except that "uncarved block" has been reified. As a result, what was an excellent analogy of the Tao has become sterile and counterproductive." 
Citing the pu translations of Séraphin Couvreur "wood that has not been worked on; simple, without ornament, without disguise" and Bernhard Karlgren "wood in its natural state, not worked: rough, plain, natural, simple"; Pas and Leung conclude, "it is obvious where the expression "uncarved block" came from, but the addition of "block" is an interpretation. The term means "plain wood," "uncarved wood.""

Etymology
Reconstructions of Old Chinese pronunciations have transformed Chinese etymology. Old Chinese reconstructions of pu or bu  include: 
bú < *pûk or *b'ûk
bú < *puk or *b'uk "shrubby trees", pŭ < *p'uk "rough; unadorned", and pò < *p'ǔk "trim unworked wood; robust, solid"
pú < *phruk
bú < *puk or *buk
pú < *phrôk "to trim wood", "in a natural state, unworked"
 pŭ < *pʰˤrok "unworked wood"

Victor Mair suggests that pu < *phluk  "unhewn log" is "almost certainly related to the English word "block," which probably derives from the Indo-European root bhelk (beam)".

Axel Schuessler says the etymology of pú < *phrôk "to trim wood" could either be an "aspirated iterative derivation" from bāo < *prôk  "cut up, peel, pluck", or "belong to the homophonous etymon with the basic meaning 'in a natural state, unworked', as in pú  'in a natural state',  'unworked precious stone'."

Early textual references
Pu occurs in some of the earliest Chinese classics, frequently in Daoist ones.

Shijing
Two odes in the Shijing "Classic of Poetry" use pu  compounds to mean "an oak".

Pusu  occurs in Ode 23: "scrubby oaks", "a clump of oaks", "low shrubby trees". The Mao commentary describes the pusu as a 小木 "small tree". The Erya (above) writes this reversible compound as supu .

Yupu  is the name of Ode 238, which records using this tree for firewood: "the yih and the p'oh", "the oak clumps". Commentaries describe the yupu as a "dense and shrubby tree".

In addition, Ode 132 has baoli : "the bushy oaks", "a clump of oaks", "luxuriant oaks". The Erya has baoli , writing bao as  "an oak" instead of  "bushy; luxuriant".

Shujing
The Shujing "Classic of History" (Zhoushu , Zicai  "Chinese catalpa lumber" section) uses pu once in the compound pozhou  (po "trim unworked wood" and zhuo "hack; chop off"): "as in working with the wood of the rottlera, when the toil of the coarser and finer operations has been completed, they have to apply the paint of red and other colours", "It is as when one works on catalpa wood; when he has toiled in trimming and carving it, he should take measures for making it red or green". Legge notes that pu means "the rough fashioning of the work" and zhou means "the fine finish given to it". Karlgren quotes the Han commentator Ma Rong that po  denotes "wood that has not yet been worked into a utensil; unworked wood", and concludes  po means "to treat the unworked wood (in the first rough cutting); to trim" is a variation of the same stem as pu  "in a natural state; simple".

Daodejing
Six Daodejing chapters use pu , two of them twice, for a total of 8 occurrences. 

Chapter 19 parallels the near-synonyms su  "raw silk; white; plain; simple; quiet" and pu  "unworked wood; plain; simple", and was the source for Ge Hong's pen-name Baopuzi "Master who Embraces Simplicity". 
Evince the plainness of undyed silk, Embrace the simplicity of the unhewn log; Lessen selfishness, Diminish desires; Abolish learning and you will be without worries. (19).
Holmes Welch describes pu "the Uncarved Block" and su "Raw Silk" as symbols that Laozi used to expound his basic doctrine of "the return to our original nature". In modern usage, pu and su mean "plain," but originally pu "was wood as it came from the tree before man had dressed it", while su "was silk that man had never dyed or painted."  

Chapters 28 and 57 mention simple pu in reference to shengren  "sages", Chapter 15 similarly refers to ancient Daoist adepts and describes pu as dun  "sincere; honest; plain".
If eternal integrity suffices, You will return to the simplicity of the unhewn log. ... When the unhewn log is sawn apart, it is made into tools; When the sage is put to use, he becomes the chief of officials. For Great carving does no cutting. (28) 
The sage has a saying: "I take no action, yet the people transform themselves; I do not interfere in affairs, yet the people enrich themselves; I desire not to desire, yet the people of themselves become simple as unhewn logs." (57) 
Those of old who were adept in the Way were ... hesitant, as though crossing a stream in winter; cautious, as though fearful of their neighbors all around; solemn, as though guests in someone else's house; shrinking, as ice when it melts; plain, as an unhewn log; muddled, as turbid waters; expansive, as a broad valley. (15)
Among all the Daodejing occurrences of pu, chapter 28 is the only case in which the transmitted and excavated versions are significantly different – the transmitted text has an extra grammatical particle zhi  "a possessive marker; a 3rd person pronoun" after yong  "use; employ". Robert G. Henricks explains this small grammatical change between the standard text saying the sage yong zhi "uses it" and the excavated silk text saying yong "is used". The transmitted version  "When the uncarved wood is broken up, it is turned into concrete things. But when the sage uses it, he becomes the leading official." should be read  "When uncarved wood is cut up, it's turned into vessels. When the Sage is used, he becomes the Head of Officials." D. C. Lau says the traditional passage "seems to say that when the uncarved block shatters it becomes vessels. A vessel is a specialist who is only fitted to be an official. Hence the sage when he makes use of these vessels becomes the lord over the officials.", but in Mawangdui passage, "The meaning is very different. The uncarved block is a symbol for the sage. Just as the uncarved block becomes vessels when it shatters so does the sage become the chief of the officials when he allows himself to be employed, and just as the uncarved block is ruined when it becomes useful, so does a sage become ruined when he becomes useful." The word qi  "vessel; utensil" is translated here as "tools", "concrete things", "vessels", "specialists", and "officials".

Chapters 32 and 37 both address houwang  "feudal lords and kings" and describe the Dao as wuming  "nameless", while 37 also calls pu "nameless".
The Way is eternally nameless. Though the unhewn log is small, No one in the world dares subjugate it. If feudal lords and kings could maintain it, The myriad creatures would submit of themselves. (32) 
The Way is eternally nameless. If feudal lords and kings preserve it, The myriad creatures will be transformed by themselves. After transformation, if they wish to rise up, I shall restrain them with the nameless unhewn log. By restraining them with the nameless unhewn log, They will not feel disgraced; Not feeling disgraced, They will be still, Whereupon heaven and earth will be made right by themselves. (37)
Chapter 37 has a minor textual difference between buyu  "not desire" in the standard version and buru  "not disgrace" in the Mawangdui version.

Lau explains pu in the Daodejing primarily means "the uncarved block is in a state as yet untouched by the artificial interference of human ingenuity and so is a symbol for the original state of man before desire is produced in him by artificial means".

Three chapters (28, 32, 37) use  in both text and commentary, and one (15) uses  in both.
"If they change and want to rise, the ego will suppress them by means of the [] simplicity of the nameless."; "The ego is the personality. The [] simplicity of the nameless is Tao. If all beings change into their selves, but afterwards revert to desire and exhibit shrewdness and hypocrisy, the princes and the king are obliged to suppress personality by means of Tao and Te." (37)
"Simple like [] unworked wood."; "What is simple is material and firm. The form of unworked wood is not yet carved. Within one ought to take care of the spirits, outwards one ought not to be pretentious." (15)
"Look at simplicity and hold fast to [] naturalness."; "To look at simplicity corresponds to holding fast to simplicity and keeping to truth as well as to not looking at externals. To hold fast to [] naturalness corresponds to looking at real naturalness in order to show it to the subjects. Thereby one may become a model." (19)
"I am without desires, and the people are [] simple of themselves."; "If I am always without desires, if I do away with externals, then the people will follow me and remain [] simple and natural." (57)

For examples, 
"He [the saint] always induces the people not to know and not to desire."; "Return to [] simplicity and retain purity." (3)
"Sincere words are not beautiful."; "Sincere words are true words. What is not beautiful is [] simple and real." (81)

Welch paraphrases the Daodejing relationship among pu, de "inherent character; inner power", and wuwei "non-action; non-doing". Outwardly, one cannot achieve de "until you have erased the aggressive patterns etched by society into your nature. You must return to your natural self, to [pu]. You must discard morality and ambition, for if you keep these you will never be capable of compassion, moderation, and humility. When you discard some of your wishes, you will have them all." Inwardly, one performs several cultivations. "For, to achieve the outward [pu] you will have to cultivate a [wuwei] of the mind. And when the mind is quiet, [pu] will deepen. It will become a faculty for intuitively sensing the order of the universe—the [Dao] that can be named."

Zhuangzi
Pu occurs 20 times in the (ca. 3rd century BCE) Daoist classic Zhuangzi. The standard Zhuangzi text writes pu both with the 16–stroke character  six times in three chapters (9, 13, and 31) and with the 6–stroke variant character  fourteen times in six chapters (7, 10, 12, 14, 16, and 20), which evidences the heterogeneous textual origins. For instance, the word pubi (with bi  "low; mean; vulgar; unsophisticated") is written both  "crude, mean [heart]" (chapter 31) and  "simple and unsophisticated [people]" (10).

A frequently occurring Zhuangzi metaphor contrasts returning to pu  "unhewn log" with carving qi  "vessels" (which means "specialist; official" in Daodejing 28). 
In a world of ultimate integrity, men would dwell together with the birds and the beasts. ... Equally without desire, this is called [] "the simplicity of the unhewn log". With [] the simplicity of the unhewn log, the people would attain their nature. ... Therefore, if [] the simple, unhewn log remained intact, who would carve a sacrificial vessel from it? ... The [] carving of the unhewn log into [] instruments is the fault of the craftsman; the impairment of the Way and integrity with humaneness and righteousness is the error of the sage. (9)
Liezi "came to believe that he had barely begun to learn. ... He took no sides in affairs and [] whittled himself back to the simplicity of the unhewn log. Clodlike, he stood alone in his physical form. Sealed off against perplexity, in this manner he remained whole to the end." (7)
"I have heard it said, 'After all the carving and chiseling, [] Return to the simplicity of the unhewn log'." (20)

Another Zhuangzi chapter uses this term fupu  "return to simplicity".
If you were to meet someone who understands great plainness, who subscribes to nonaction and [] returns to the simplicity of the unhewn log, who embodies his nature and embraces his spirit, so as to wander through the common world, you would really be surprised! (12)

See also
 Buddhist ethics
 Tabula rasa
 Ziran

References
 
 
 
 
 
 
 

 

Footnotes

Further reading
 Baxter, William H. (1992), A Handbook of Old Chinese Phonology, Mouton de Gruyter.
 Girardot, Norman J. (1988), Myth and Meaning in Early Taoism: The Themes of Chaos (Hun-Tun)], University of California Press. pp. 70, 56, 117.
 Karlgren, Bernhard (1950), "The Book of Documents", Bulletin of the Museum of Far Eastern Antiquities 22:1–81.
 Kraemer, Kenneth (1986), World Scriptures: An Introduction to Comparative Religions, Paulist Press.
 Legge, James (1871), The She King or Book of Poetry, in The Chinese Classics, vol. 4, Oxford University Press.
 Legge, James, tr. (1865), The Shoo King, in ''The Chinese Classics, vol. 3, Oxford University Press.

External links
 pu (Daoism), Britannica Online Encyclopedia
 Houpo 厚朴, Hong Kong Baptist University School of Chinese Medicine.

Chinese words and phrases
Taoist philosophy